The Guangdong Leopards are a China Baseball League team based in Guangzhou. Their home field is the 1,000-capacity Tianhe Sports Center.

Notable players

References

Baseball in China
Sports teams in Guangdong